Matagaga (possibly from Quechua mata united, qaqa rock, "united rock") is a mountain on the eastern extensions of the Cordillera Blanca in the Andes of Peru, about  high. It is situated in the Ancash Region, Huari Province, Chavin de Huantar District. Mata Qaqa lies east of the Rangracancha valley (possibly from Quechua for "stoney corral") and northeast of the Challhua valley (possibly from Quechua challwa fish). The Mosna River flows along its northern slopes.

References 

Mountains of Peru
Mountains of Ancash Region